Subdivisions of the Polish–Lithuanian Commonwealth evolved over for centuries of its existence from the signing of the Union of Lublin to the third partition.

The lands that once belonged to the Commonwealth are now largely distributed among several central, eastern, and northern European countries: Poland (except western Poland), Lithuania, Latvia, Belarus, most of Ukraine, parts of Russia, southern half of Estonia, and smaller pieces in Slovakia, Romania and Moldova.

Terminology
While the term "Poland" was also commonly used to denote this whole polity, Poland was in fact only part of a greater whole – the Polish–Lithuanian Commonwealth, which comprised primarily two parts:
the Crown of the Kingdom of Poland (Poland proper), colloquially "the Crown"; and
the Grand Duchy of Lithuania, colloquially "Lithuania".

The Crown in turn comprised two "prowincjas": Greater Poland and Lesser Poland.  These and a third province, the Grand Duchy of Lithuania, were the only three regions that were properly termed "provinces".  The Commonwealth was further divided into smaller administrative units known as voivodeships (województwa – note that some sources use the word palatinate instead of voivodeship). Each voivodeship was governed by a Voivode (governor). Voivodeships were further divided into powiats (often translated as county) being governed by a starosta generalny or grodowy. Cities were governed by castellans. There were frequent exceptions to these rules, often involving the ziemia subunit of administration: for details on the administrative structure of the Commonwealth, see the article on offices in the Polish–Lithuanian Commonwealth.

Royal lands (królewszczyzna) further divided into starostwa, each starostwo being governed by a starosta niegrodowy.

Administrative division 
By provinces, voivodeships and lesser entities.

Crown of the Kingdom of Poland

Crown of the Kingdom of Poland or just colloquially the Crown is the name for the territories under Polish direct administration in the times of Kingdom of Poland until the end of Polish–Lithuanian Commonwealth in 1795.

Two important ecclesiastical entities with high degree of autonomy within the Crown of Poland were Duchy of Siewierz and Prince-Bishopric of Warmia.

Fiefs of Crown of Poland included the Lauenburg and Bütow Land and two condominiums (joint domain) with the Grand Duchy of Lithuania: Duchy of Livonia and Duchy of Courland and Semigallia.

Some enclaves in the Hungarian area of Spisz were also part of Poland (due to the Treaty of Lubowla).

Grand Duchy of Lithuania 

The Grand Duchy of Lithuania or just colloquially Lithuania is the name for the territories under direct Lithuanian administration during medieval sovereign Lithuanian statehood, and later until the end of common Polish-Lithuanian Commonwealth statehood in 1795.

Just before the Union of Lublin (1569), four voivodeships (Kiev, Podlaskie, Bracław, and Wołyń) of the Grand Duchy of Lithuania were transferred to the Polish Crown by direct order of Sigismund II Augustus, and the Duchy of Livonia, acquired in 1561, became a condominium (joint domain) of both Lithuania and Poland. The Duchy of Courland and Semigallia was another condominium.

After 1569, Lithuania had eight voivodeships and one eldership remaining: 
 

One of the oldest Lithuanian territories, the Duchy of Samogitia, had a status equal to that of a voivodeship, but retained the name Duchy.

After the Livonian War (1558–1582), Lithuania acquired vassal state Duchy of Courland with capital in Jelgava.

Fiefs

Duchy of Prussia (1569–1657) 

The Duchy of Prussia was a duchy in the eastern part of Prussia from 1525 to 1701. In 1525 during the Protestant Reformation, the Grand Master of the Teutonic Knights, Albert of Hohenzollern, secularized the Prussian State of the Teutonic Order, becoming Albert, Duke in Prussia. His duchy, which had its capital in Königsberg (Kaliningrad), was established as a fief of the Crown of Poland, as had been Teutonic Prussia since the Second Peace of Thorn in October 1466. This treaty had ended the War of the Cities or Thirteen Years' War and provided for the Order's cession of its rights over the western half of its territories to the Polish crown, which became the province of Royal Prussia, while the remaining part of the Order's land became a fief of the Kingdom of Poland (1385–1569). In the 17th century King John II Casimir of Poland submitted Frederick William to regain Prussian suzerainty in return for supporting Poland against Sweden. On 29 July 1657, they signed the Treaty of Wehlau in Wehlau (Polish: Welawa; now Znamensk), whereby Frederick William renounced a previous Swedish-Prussian alliance and John Casimir recognised Frederick William's full sovereignty over the Duchy of Prussia. Full sovereignty was a necessary prerequisite for upgrading the Duchy to Kingdom of Prussia in 1701.

Duchy of Livonia (Inflanty) (1569–1772) 

The Duchy of Livonia was a territory of the Grand Duchy of Lithuania – and later a joint domain (Condominium) of the Polish Crown and the Grand Duchy of Lithuania

Duchy of Courland and Semigallia (Courland) (1562–1791)

The Duchy of Courland and Semigallia is a duchy in the Baltic region that existed from 1562 to 1791 as a vassal state of the Grand Duchy of Lithuania and later the Polish–Lithuanian Commonwealth. From 1685, District of Pilten was in union with the duchy. In 1791 it gained full independence, but on 28 March 1795, it was annexed by the Russian Empire in the Third Partition of Poland. The duchy also had colonies in Tobago and Gambia

Protectorates 
Caffa

In 1462, during the expansion of the Ottoman Empire and the Crimean Tatars, Caffa placed itself under the protection of King Casimir IV of Poland. The proposition of protection was accepted by the Polish king but when the real danger came, help for Caffa never arrived.

Reforms of the 1793 Grodno Sejm
Following the territorial losses of the Second Partition of Poland, the Grodno Sejm of 1793 introduced a new administrative division (italic marks new voivodeships):
 in the Crown: Chełm Voivodeship, Ciechanów Voivodeship, Kraków Voivodeship, Lublin Voivodeship, Masovian Voivodeship, Podlasie Voivodeship, Sandomierz Voivodeship, Warsaw Voivodeship, Włodzimierz Voivodeship and Wołyń Voivodeship
 in the Grand Duchy: Brasław Voivodeship, Brześć Voivodeship, Grodno Voivodeship, Merecz Voivodeship, Nowogródek Voivodeship, Troki Voivodeship, Wilno Voivodeship, Żmudź Voivodeship (Samogitian Voivodeship)

Proposed divisions

Polish–Lithuanian–Ruthenian Commonwealth 
Thought was given at various times to the creation of a Grand Duchy of Ruthenia, particularly during the 1648 Cossack insurrection against Polish rule in Ukraine.  Such a Duchy, as proposed in the 1658 Treaty of Hadiach, would have been a full member of the Commonwealth, which would thereupon have become a tripartite Polish–Lithuanian–Ruthenian Commonwealth, but due to szlachta demands, Muscovite invasion, and division among the Cossacks, the plan was never implemented.

Polish–Lithuanian–Muscovite Commonwealth 
For similar reasons, plans for a Polish–Lithuanian–Muscovite Commonwealth also were never realized, although during the Polish–Muscovite War (1605–18) the Polish Prince (later, King) Władysław IV Waza was briefly elected Tsar of Muscovy.

References

 
 
Former subdivisions of Poland
Political history of Lithuania
Political history of Poland